List of Ancient Jain temples

See also 
 List of largest Jain temples

References

Jainism-related lists
History of Jainism
Jain temples
Jain temples by century